The 5th Heavy Weight Transport Company was a heavy weight transport company of the Foreign Legion in the French Army. On April 30, 1964, following the dissolution of the 4th Foreign Regiment 4e RE, the 6th Mounted Company of the 4th Foreign Infantry Regiment 4e REI became the 5th Mounted Company of the 2nd Foreign Regiment 2e REI. On May 1, 1965, the company was designated as the 5th Heavy Weight Transport Company. Transformed into a Military Train Unit, the activities of the company revolved mainly, around the evacuation of the Sahara.

The 5th Heavy Weight Transport Company 5e CTGP of the 2nd Foreign Infantry Regiment was divided in several platoons corresponding to the different types of vehicles and missions. The commandment, the GLR and GBO Berliet platoons were based at Reggane; the Willeme platoon at Béchar.

The vehicles of the company circulated from the confines of the in-between of the Sahara and the Mediterranean Sea, on the Mers El Kébir axis - In Amguel.

The 5th Heavy Weight Transport Company of the 2e REI was dissolved on July 1, 1967, during the implantation of the regiment at Bou-Sfer.

Insignia 

Golden crown bearing the inscription : « 5e COMPAGNIE TRANSPORT - LÉGION ETRANGERE »; in the center, a Silver Minaret (Fire Lighthouse Tower at origin, then would be found adjacent in numbers, to Mosques) centered in a five branched golden Star. Heir to the traditions of the 6th Mounted Company of the 4e REI., the 5e CTGP has retaken the symbols (Star and Minaret). The insignia was created for Camerone 1966, by Captain Oui, Commandant of the company.

References

Sources 
Centre de documentation de la Légion étrangère

Units of the French Foreign Legion
Transport units and formations
Company sized units
Military units and formations established in 1965
Military units and formations disestablished in 1967